Live 2 Infinitea is a live album by Gong, recorded in April 2000 during Gong's European tour.

Track listing 
 "Foolefare" (Allen, Travis) – 0:46
 "Zeroid" (Allen, Howlett, Travis) – 6:08
 "Magdalene (Intro)" 	Malherbe) – 2:15
 "Magdalene" (Allen, Howlett, Malherbe, Travis) – 5:05
 "Infinitea" (Allen, Howlett, Smyth, Taylor, Travis) – 3:58
 "The Mad Monk" (Allen, Howlett, Taylor, Travis) – 3:29
 "Zero the Hero & The Witch's Spell" (Allen, Tritsch) – 9:26
 "Bodilingus (Intro)" (Malherbe) – 0:53
 "Bodilingus" (Allen, Howlett, Taylor, Travis) – 5:19
 "Inner Temple" (Allen, Malherbe) – 2:36
 "Yoni On Mars" (Smyth, Travis) – 6:57
 "Tropical Fish" (Allen) – 3:42
 "Invisible Temple" (Allen, Howlett, Malherbe, Travis) – 9:07
 "Selene" (Allen, Smyth) – 6:50

Personnel 
 Daevid Allen – guitar, vocals, glissando guitar
 Gilli Smyth – space whisper
 Howard Scarr – keyboards, electronics, backing vocals
 Mike Howlett – bass
 Chris Taylor – drums, backing vocals
 Didier Malherbe – flute, alto saxophone, soprano saxophone, doudouk
 Theo Travis – soprano saxophone, tenor saxophone
 Basil Brooks – additional bubbles on "Inner Temple"

Production
 Dean Barratt – mixing
 Ole-Petter Dronen - recording and mixing (Track 2,14)
 John Bennett - recording and mixing (Track: 12, 13)
 Ben Matthews – mixing (Track: 1,3,11)
 John Bennett – engineer
 Denis Blackham – mastering
 Michael Heatley – liner notes
 Joss Mullinger – photography
 Recorded At – Subterania 
 Recorded At – Phoenix Arts Centre, Exeter (Track 12,13)
 Recorded At – Garage, Bergen (Track 2,14)

References

External links

Gong (band) live albums
2000 live albums